Rob Galbraith is a photographer and photojournalism teacher who became well-known as a photography writer with his Digital Photography Insights (DPI) website, known for its memory card benchmarks and its analysis of the Canon 1D autofocus system.

In 2012 Rob Galbraith announced that he would be focusing on his photojournalism teaching job and thus he would cease posting updates to his website.

References

External links

Canadian photojournalists
Living people
Year of birth missing (living people)